Aquarium is a 2022 Indian Malayalam-language drama film written and directed by Deepesh T. The film's screenplay is written by Balram Mattannur . The film features Honey Rose, Sunny Wayne in lead roles. The film was released on Saina Play OTT Platform on 9 April 2022. There was a long case on high court which prevents the release of this film for 10 years.

Plot
The story revolves around the lives of nuns in a small Convent. The movie starts with joining of a new nun into the Convent. She soon take care of a nun discarded by other nuns in the convent. She get totally upset and a priest comes in her support. Other nuns in the Convent misunderstood the relationship between the priest and this nun.

Cast
 Honey Rose as Sister Elcita
 Rajshri Ponnappa as Sister Jaseentha
 Sunny Wayne as Father Shibu
 Shari
 Sabu Cyril
 V K Prakash
 Sathar
 Santha Kumari
 Urmila Unni
 Theertha Ratnakaran
 Dhanya Malu

Release
The principal photography was completed in 2013. The release of the film was delayed by various cases against this film due to its controversial content. Later a release was scheduled on 13 May 2021. But there was a stay order upon this release from Hight court of Kerala. At last the film was released on 9 April 2022.

References

External links

2022 films
2020s Malayalam-language films
2022 drama films